Dorks and Damsels is a 2007 Icelandic film directed by Gunnar B. Guðmundsson.

Plot
The film revolves around Hildur, a national celebrity and socialite who has to look for a job when her boyfriend Jolli is sent to prison. She finds a job at Astrópía, a store that sells role playing books and her immersion into geek culture changes her outlook on life.

Cast
Ragnhildur Steinunn Jónsdóttir as Hildur, a celebrity whose life changes suddenly when her boyfriend Jolli is sent to prison
Snorri Engilbertsson as Dagur, a translator of romantic novels and customer at Astrópía, who develops a romantic interest in Hildur
Davíð Þór Jónsson as Jolli, Hildur's boyfriend and owner of a car dealership, who is sent to prison for fraud
Sverrir Þór Sverrisson as Flóki, an employee at Astrópía who manages the DVD section
Pétur Jóhann Sigfússon as Pési, an employee at Astrópía who manages the comic book section
Halla Vilhjálmsdóttir as Beta, a member of Dagur's role-playing group
Jörundur Ragnarsson as Scat, a member of Dagur's role-playing group
Halldór Magnússon as Goggi, owner of Astrópía and gamemaster of Dagur's role-playing group
Sara Guðmundsdóttir as Björt, a friend of Hildur's
Alexander Sigurðsson as Snorri, Björt's 8-year-old son
Bjarni Gautur as a customer in Astrópía

External links
 Review in Variety
 Review in Ain't It Cool News
 

2007 films
2000s Icelandic-language films
2000s fantasy comedy films
Icelandic fantasy comedy films
2007 comedy films